Changuion is a Dutch, French and South African family of which a member was ennobled in the Netherlands in 1815.

History 
The surname "Changuion" (pronunciation: [ʃɑ̃ɡɥijɔ̃]) may originally have been Champguyon and may have been derived from the eponymous commune of Champguyon in Marne, France. One of the first historical mentions of the surname appeared in 1562 as a result of the massacre of Wassy, a town in the old French province of Champagne. A Pierre Changuion, was namely mentioned as being one of the Protestant or Huguenot churchgoers who were attacked by Roman Catholics. After this event, some of Pierre's family moved to Vitry-le-François. The Changuion family were members of the bourgeoisie and many of them decided to leave France around the time of the revocation of the Edict of Nantes in 1685 due to the resulting religious persecutions. They then settled in neighbouring Protestant countries. Today there are still some Changuions living in the region of France where the family originally came from.

One of the Dutch branches of the Changuion family, from which sprouted the South African branch, started with Jean Changuion, who was born in Vitry-le-Francois in 1660 and settled in Halle (Saale) in Germany where he died in 1700. His son François (1694-1777) was baptised in Frankfurt (Oder) in 1694 and moved to Amsterdam in about 1717 where he was burgher and bookdealer. In 1724 Francois established a printing house, which would become very successful. His grandson François Daniël (1766-1850) was elevated to the Dutch nobility on 16 September 1815 due to his role as secretary of the provisional government of the Netherlands (the Triumvirate under Van Hogendorp) in 1813. Thanks to his role as secretary, he is considered one of the founders of the Kingdom of the Netherlands. Through his elevation to the nobility, he and his descendants were allowed to use the predicate jonkheer and jonkvrouw. (In addition, as a member of the nobility, he was given the right to bear a crown in the crest of his coat of arms.) 

In 1823, F.D. Changuion was in absentia found guilty of fraud by a court. Two years later, in 1825, a list of the persons belonging to the nobility was compiled for the first time in the Netherlands. Only F.D. Changuion's children born before 27 February 1823 (the date of his sentencing), and not he, were named on this list. These children remained part of the nobility, and could therefore pass their nobility down to their descendants. This is also the current point of view of the High Council of Nobility of the Netherlands.

Briët argued in 2019 that a decision that implied that F.D. Changuion was stripped of his noble status, was never taken. Moreover disbarment from the nobility is not based on any statutory regulation or other legal grounds, according to Briët. This opinion of Briët is not shared by everyone. F.D. Changuion was generally considered to no longer belong to the Dutch nobility after 1825. 

One of François Daniël's sons, Antoine Changuion (1803-1881) moved to South Africa in 1831 to take up a professorship at the South African Athenaeum (founded in 1829, later known as the South African College and currently as the University of Cape Town).

Another Dutch branch of the family settled in Leiden after leaving Wassy in 1686, and became involved in the textile industry. This branch of the family would eventually produce lawyer, writer and administrator, Pierre-Jean Changuion (1763-1820), who was appointed as governor of Curacao in 1804.

Some descendants 

 François Changuion (1694-1777), burgher, bookdealer en publisher in Amsterdam.
 François Changuion (1727-after 1776), council in the court of police and justice in Essequebo (then part of a Dutch colony and now the Cooperative Republic of Guyana) and president of the orphanage, commander of Essequebo, petty bourgeoisie of Deventer.
 Jonkheer Dr. François Daniël Changuion (1766-1850), member of the city council and aldermen of Leiden, secretary of the provisional government (the Triumvirate under Van Hogendorp) in 1813, commissioner-general with the British troops, the first ambassador of the Netherlands to the United States of America, elevated to the Dutch nobility in 1815, not mentioned on the nobility list of 1825.
 Prof. Jonkheer Dr. Antoine Nicolas Ernest Changuion (1803-1881), professor in Cape Town, prodigious writer in theological and literary fields; he had nine children and from these sprang an extensive progeny belonging to the Dutch nobility. All the Changuions who come from South Africa today are descended from his son Louis Annes Changuion (1840-1910). A branch of A.N.E. Changuion's descendants, namely the descendants of his son Abraham Arnoldus Faure Changuion (1835-1877), changed their surname to Chanquin.
 Jonkheer Abraham Arnoldus Faure Changuion (1835-1877), ancestor of the Chanquins of South Africa.
 Jonkheer Louis Annes Changuion (1840-1910), land surveyor in Robertson and ancestor of the Changuions of South Africa.
 Dr. Pierre Changuion (1700-1758), councilor of Brabant and of Overmaas, in 1741 appointed chief judge of the feudal court of Brabant.
 Dr. Paul Changuion (1733-1804), councilor and later city clerk of Vlissingen, appointed city clerk of Middelburg in 1774.
 Dr. Pierre-Jean Changuion (1763-1820), secretary of the court of Holland until 1795, then member of the court of Den Bosch and Breda. From 1804 to 1807 he was governor of Curacao, which in that year was taken over by Great Britain; back in the Netherlands sentenced to death for the loss of Curacao but the verdict was be reversed by Louis Napoléon. In 1814 he was restored in his honor by Willem I and appointed clerk of the court van Goes, and in 1816 appointed councilor-fiscal in the political council in Suriname and became secretary of this body in 1817.

See also 
List of Dutch noble families

References 

Dutch nobility
Huguenot families
Huguenot history
French-language surnames
Dutch noble families